

Friedrich Schulz (15 October 1897 – 30 November 1976) was a German general during World War II. He was a recipient of the Knight's Cross of the Iron Cross with Oak Leaves and Swords of Nazi Germany.

Awards
 1914 Iron Cross 2nd Class (2 June 1916) 1st Class (27 January 1918)
 1939 Clasp to the Iron Cross 2nd Class (6 April 1940) & 1st Class (14 June 1940)
 Knight's Cross of the Iron Cross with Oak Leaves and Swords
 Knight's Cross on 29 March 1942 as Oberst im Generalstab and chief of the general staff of the XXXXIII. Armee-Korps
 428th Oak Leaves on 20 March 1944 as Generalleutnant and acting commander of the III. Panzer-Korps
 135th Swords on 26 February 1945 as General der Infanterie and commander in chief of the 17. Armee

References

Citations

Bibliography
.
 
 

1897 births
1976 deaths
People from Zielona Góra County
German Army generals of World War II
Generals of Infantry (Wehrmacht)
People from the Province of Silesia
Recipients of the Knight's Cross of the Iron Cross with Oak Leaves and Swords
Prussian Army personnel
German Army personnel of World War I
Reichswehr personnel
Recipients of the Iron Cross (1914), 1st class